Jesper Ollas (born April 27, 1984) is a Swedish professional ice hockey player currently playing as Captain of Leksands IF of the HockeyAllsvenskan (Allsv).

During his initial tenure with Leksand, Ollas played an Elitserien season in 2005–06, he has also played in the top flight SHL with Brynäs IF, capturing the Le Mat trophy in the 2011–12 season.

Awards and honors

References

External links
 

1984 births
IFK Arboga IK players
Brynäs IF players
Leksands IF players
Living people
Swedish ice hockey right wingers
Sportspeople from Norrköping